Dietmar Wuttke (born August 2, 1978) is a German former footballer. Wuttke began his career with Energie Cottbus, where he made 14 appearances in the 2. Bundesliga. He later played for Bayern Munich II, FC Schweinfurt 05 and SSV Reutlingen before his career was cut short by injury.

References

External links

1978 births
Living people
German footballers
FC Energie Cottbus players
FC Energie Cottbus II players
FC Bayern Munich II players
1. FC Schweinfurt 05 players
SSV Reutlingen 05 players
2. Bundesliga players
Association football midfielders